Heritage High School is one of three public secondary schools in Rockdale County in Conyers, Georgia, United States (the others being Rockdale County High School and Salem High School), under the Rockdale County School District. Heritage High School is home of the Patriots. It has twice been named a School of Excellence. In December 2009, U.S. News & World Report gave Heritage High School a silver medal ranking in the top 500 high schools in the nation. In 2014 Heritage High School became an Academy for Performing and Visual Arts.

Shooting
On May 20, 1999, a month to the day after the Columbine High School massacre, 15-year-old student Anthony "T.J." Solomon opened fire with a .22-caliber rifle on the Heritage campus, wounding six students. A 15-year-old girl was hospitalized in critical condition, and the other victims suffered non-life-threatening injuries. Solomon attempted suicide with a revolver but was talked into surrendering by an assistant principal. Solomon initially faced up to 351 years of prison if convicted of aggravated assault and other charges, but in 2000 he was found guilty but mentally ill, and was sentenced to 40 years in prison and 65 years of probation. A judge later reduced his sentence from 40 to 20 years. He was released to his mother's house on parole on July 26, 2016.

Performing Arts
In July 2014, Heritage High School became an Academy for Performing and Visual Arts, also referred to as the Fine Arts Program. Students accepted into the program are enrolled in one of the following majors:

 Vocal Music
 Instrumental Music
 Dance
 Theatre
 Technical Theatre
 Visual Arts

Theater 
Heritage High School's drama department won the Georgia High School Association one act play competition at the 6A level in 2017 and 2018. Also in 2017, they won the Georgia High School Theater Award for Overall Production, for their production of Les Misérables'.

Notable alumni

 Tyler Austin, Yokohama DeNA Baystars first baseman and outfielder
 The members of the band Cartel
 Clint Mathis, World Cup soccer player
 Jack McBrayer, actor, singer, and comedian
 Jamie Newton, founder of Golf Turf Management; appeared on one season of Survivor''
 Richard T. Scott, artist, writer, and coin designer for the United States Mint.
 Marcus Printup, Jazz Trumpeter and member of the Jazz at Lincoln Center Orchestra under the leadership of Wynton Marsalis.

References

External links
 Heritage High School website
 Rockdale County Public Schools website

Schools in Rockdale County, Georgia
Public high schools in Georgia (U.S. state)
Educational institutions established in 1976
1976 establishments in Georgia (U.S. state)